Franklin Furnace Historic District is a national historic district located in  St. Thomas Township, Franklin County, Pennsylvania. The district includes five contributing buildings, one contributing structure, and one contributing site associated with a 19th-century iron furnace plantation. The buildings are the manager's house/office and four workers' houses. The structure is the furnace stack (1828).  It measures 30 feet square at the base and approximately 30 feet tall.  The contributing site is the ruins of a barn.  The furnace ceased full operation in 1882.

It was listed on the National Register of Historic Places in 1991.

References 

Industrial buildings and structures on the National Register of Historic Places in Pennsylvania
Historic districts on the National Register of Historic Places in Pennsylvania
Historic districts in Franklin County, Pennsylvania
National Register of Historic Places in Franklin County, Pennsylvania